Madu Station is a station on Ilsan Line in Goyang, South Korea. It is located not too far from an E-Mart. It is close to Western Dom shopping and restaurants.

Station layout

References 

Seoul Metropolitan Subway stations
Railway stations opened in 1996
Metro stations in Goyang
Seoul Subway Line 3